The 1936–37 Luxembourg National Division was the 27th season of top level association football in Luxembourg.

Overview
It was contested by 10 teams, and Jeunesse Esch won the championship.

League standings

Results

1st playoff

2nd playoff

References
Luxembourg - List of final tables (RSSSF)

Luxembourg National Division seasons
Lux
Nat